Kuweires Sharqi is a town in eastern Aleppo Governorate, northwestern Syria, mostly known for the Kuweires Military Airbase  to the northeast. In the 2004 census, it had a population of 3,129.

References

Subdistricts of Aleppo Governorate